Bryan Thomas Schmidt (born February 13, 1969) is an American science fiction author and editor. He has edited (or co-edited) fifteen anthologies, a space opera trilogy, and an ongoing, near-future police procedural series set in Kansas City, Missouri. He wrote a non-fiction book on how to write a novel. He was a finalist, with Jennifer Brozek, for the 2015 Hugo Award for Best Professional Editor for the anthology Shattered Shields. His anthology, Infinite Stars, was nominated for the 2018 Locus Award for Best Anthology.

Biography
Schmidt was born on February 13, 1969, in Topeka, Kansas. His works sometime incorporate Christian themes. Schmidt's first published works were the short stories in his The North Star Serial, a 2010 series of space opera stories depicting an ongoing war. The Worker Prince, the first novel in his Saga of Davi Rhii series, was published in 2011. The second novel, The Returning, was released the following year in June, two months after his first anthology, Full-Throttle Space Tales 6: Space Battles, was published in April through Flying Pen Press. In 2013, Schmidt edited Beyond the Sun, a space opera anthology from Fairwood Press, and Raygun Chronicles: Space Opera for a New Age from Every Day Publishing.

After a recommendation from Jennifer Brozek, he was asked to edit The Martian. He worked with the author, Andy Weir, to improve the story. In 2014, he was nominated for the Hugo Award for Best Professional Editor (short form) for his anthology work, but missed the cutoff for the final ballot by six votes. The following year, he and Brozek edited the fantasy adventure anthology, Shattered Shields, published by Baen Books. They were both nominated for the 2015 Hugo Award for Best Editor (short form) for Shattered Shields. His space opera anthology, Mission: Tomorrow, was released by Baen in 2015. Schmidt worked with WordFire Press in 2016 to release the young adult short story anthology Decision Points. The same year he released Galactic Games, a science fiction sports anthology, from Baen.

In addition to The Exodus, the final volume in his Davi Rhii trilogy, Schmidt had six anthologies published in 2017. In March, he co-edited Little Green Men—Attack! with Robin Wayne Bailey. His second WordFire anthology, Maximum Velocity: The Best of the Full-Throttle Space Tales, co-edited with Jennifer Brozek, Carol Hightshoe, David Lee Summers, and Dayton Ward, collected the best stories from the "Full-Throttle Space Tales" series of anthologies. The space opera anthology Infinite Stars and the media tie-in anthology Predator: If It Bleeds (set in the Predator universe), both from Titan Books, were released in October. Infinite Stars received a starred review in Publishers Weekly and was also ranked 15th in the Best Anthology category of the 2018 Locus Awards. That same month, he also released Joe Ledger: Unstoppable, co-edited with Jonathan Maberry), from St. Martin's Press and from Baen The Monster Hunter Files, co-edited with Larry Correia).

The first volume in his John Simon near-future police procedural series, Simon Says, was released in October 2019. Infinite Stars: Dark Frontiers, a follow-up anthology to the 2017 collection, was released through Titan Books in November. The second and third volumes in the John Simon series, The Sideman and Common Source, were released in June and September 2020, respectively. A COVID-19 charity anthology, Surviving Tomorrow, was released in October that year through Aeristic Press. Proceeds from the anthology went to purchase COVID-19 test kits.

Schmidt, with Jonathan Maberry, edited Alien vs. Predator: Ultimate Prey, released in December 2021 from Titan Books. The Hitherto Secret Experiments of Marie Curie, a dark young adult anthology co-edited with Henry Herz, is scheduled to be released in 2022 through Blackstone Publishing. His novel, Shortcut, will be published by 25 and Y Publishing, though no release date has been set. He will co-edited the Robots Through the Ages anthology with Robert Silverberg.

Bibliography

Standalone novels
Abraham Lincoln: Dinosaur Hunter: Land of Legends (March 2013, Delabarre Publishing)
Shortcut (forthcoming 2022, 25 and Y Publishing)

Saga of Davi Rhii
A science fiction series loosely based on the biblical story of Moses. 
The Worker Prince (October 2011, Diminished Media Group)
The Returning (June 2012, Diminished Media Group)
The Exodus (September 2017, WordFire Press)

In addition to the three novels, two short stories were written in the series: 
"Rivalry on the Sky Course" on Residential Aliens webzine (2011)
"The Hand of God" in Full-Throttle Space Tales 6: Space Battles (2012, Flying Pen Press)

An omnibus, collecting books 1-3 and the shorts "Rivalry on the Sky Course" and "The Hand of God", was released in October 2021 by Boralis Books.

John Simon series
A near-future police procedural series about a technophobic Kansas City police detective and his android partner.
Simon Says (October 2019, Boralis Books)
The Sideman (February 2020, Boralis Books)
Common Source (June 2020, Boralis Books)

A short work, "The Cancellation", appears in Shapers of Worlds, Volume II edited by Edward Willett (November 2021, Shadowpaw Press)

Anthologies
Schmidt edited (or co-edited) the following anthologies:
Full-Throttle Space Tales 6: Space Battles (April 2012, Flying Pen Press)
Beyond the Sun (August 2013, Fairwood Press)
Raygun Chronicles: Space Opera for a New Age (December 2013, Every Day Publishing)
Shattered Shields with Jennifer Brozek (November 2014, Baen)
Mission: Tomorrow (November 2015, Baen)
Decision Points (April 2016, WordFire Press)
Galactic Games (June 2016, Baen)
Little Green Men—Attack! with Robin Wayne Bailey (March 2017, Baen)
Maximum Velocity: The Best of the Full-Throttle Space Tales with Jennifer Brozek, Carol Hightshoe, David Lee Summers, and Dayton Ward (August 2017, WordFire Press)
Infinite Stars (October 2017, Titan Books)
Joe Ledger: Unstoppable with Jonathan Maberry (October 2017, St. Martin's Griffin)
The Monster Hunter Files with Larry Correia (October 2017, Baen)
Predator: If It Bleeds (October 2017, Titan Books)
Infinite Stars: Dark Frontiers (November 2019, Titan Books)
Surviving Tomorrow (October 2020, Aeristic Press)
Alien vs. Predator: Ultimate Prey with Jonathan Maberry (December 2021, Titan Books)
Predator: Eyes of the Demon (August 2022, Titan Books, 
The Hitherto Secret Experiments of Marie Curie with Henry Herz (forthcoming 2022, Blackstone Publishing)
Robots Through the Ages with Robert Silverberg (forthcoming, Blackstone Publishing)

Short works
Listed chronologically by release date.
"The Maintenance Man" (February–March 2010, on Einstein's Pocket Watch webzine)
The North Star Serial (May 2010) 
"Return of the Koreleans" 
"The Ambush" 
"The Chase" 
"The Getaway" 
"The Interrogation" 
"The Korelean General" 
"The Korelean Raiders" 
"The North Star" 
"The Orphaning" 
"The Pirates" 
"The Resurrection Begun" 
"The Scout" 
"The Supply Run"
"Amélie's Guardian" (March 2011, in Of Fur and Fire: Tales of Cats & Dragons from DreamZion Publishing)
"Duncan Derring and the Call of the Lady Luck" (July 2012, in Wandering Weeds from Hall Brothers Entertainment)
"La Migra" (August 2012, in Tales of the Talisman, Volume 8, Issue 1 from Hadrosaur Productions)
"Border Time" with Kate Corcino (April 2016, in Secret Agendas from IDW Publishing)
"Back to Black" with Jonathan Maberry (December 2016, in SNAFU: Black Ops from Cohesion Press) 
"First Million Contacts" with Alex Shvartsman (March 2017, in Little Green Men—Attack!)
"The Greatest Guns in the Galaxy" with Ken Scholes (July 2017, in Straight Outta Tombstone from Baen)
"Drug War" with Holly Roberds (October 2017, in Predator: If It Bleeds)
"Huffman Strikes Back" with Julie Frost (October 2017, in The Monster Hunter Files) 
"Instinct (A Ghost Story)" with G. P. Charles (October 2017, in Joe Ledger: Unstoppable)
"The Coming End" with Jonathan Miller (July 2020, in Abyss & Apex, 3rd Quarter 2020 from Abyss & Apex Publishing)
"It's a Mud, Mud World" with Peter J. Wacks (October 2020, in Weird World War III from Baen)
"First Hunt" (December 2021, in Alien vs. Predator: Ultimate Prey)

Collections
Schmidt's stories have been collected in the following volumes:
The North Star Serial, Part 1 (May 2010, Schmidt Sousa Publications)

Nonfiction
102 More Hilarious Dinosaur Jokes, illustrated by Evan Peter (April 2013, Delabarre Publishing)
How to Write a Novel: The Fundamentals of Fiction (October 2018, Inkitt)

Awards and honors
Schmidt has been nominated for a number of awards for his various works.

Notes

References

1969 births
21st-century American novelists
21st-century American short story writers
21st-century male writers
American book editors
American copy editors
American fantasy writers
American horror writers
American science fiction writers
American speculative fiction editors
Science fiction editors
Writers from Topeka, Kansas
Living people